The Turkey (French: Le Dindon) is a 1951 French period comedy film directed by Claude Barma and starring Nadine Alari, Jacqueline Pierreux and Denise Provence. It is an adaptation of Georges Feydeau's 1896 play Le Dindon (The Turkey or Sauce for the Goose). It was shot at the Epinay Studios in Paris. The film's sets were designed by the art director Henri Schmitt.

Synopsis
In Paris during the Belle Epoque, Monsieur Pontagnac loves his wife but also has a wandering eye that gets him into trouble. This happens particularly when he becomes entangled with Lucienne Vatelin, the wife of a lawyer. A variety of other characters have various suspicions and intrigue and all gather at the same hotel with farcical results.

Cast 
 Nadine Alari as Lucienne Vatelin, the notary's wife
 Jacqueline Pierreux as Armandine
 Denise Provence as Clotilde Pontagnac
 Gisèle Préville as Maggy Pacarel
 Jane Marken as Mrs Pinchard
 Louis Seigner as Mr Pinchard
 Jacques Charon as Mr Pontagnac
 Robert Hirsch as Mr Rédillon
 Jacques Morel as Maître Vatelin, notary and Lucienne's husband
 Pierre Larquey as Géronte
 Fred Pasquali as Mr Pascarel
 Louis de Funès as the manager
 Gaston Orbal as the commissioner
 Paul Bisciglia as Victor, the groom
  as the night look-out
  as the second commissioner
 Georges Bever as a client
  as Mr Grossback
  as the clerk

References

Bibliography
 Hayward, Susan. French Costume Drama of the 1950s: Fashioning Politics in Film. Intellect Books, 2010.

External links 
 
 Le Dindon (1951), frenchfilms.org

1951 films
1950s historical films
French historical films
French comedy films
1950s French-language films
French black-and-white films
Films based on works by Georges Feydeau
Films directed by Claude Barma
French films based on plays
Films scored by Gérard Calvi
1951 comedy films
Films shot at Epinay Studios
1950s French films
Films set in the 19th century
Films set in Paris